Arthur Pembleton (25 January 1895–1976) was an English footballer who played in the Football League for Millwall, Norwich City and Notts County.

References

1895 births
1976 deaths
English footballers
Association football midfielders
English Football League players
Notts County F.C. players
Millwall F.C. players
Norwich City F.C. players